Jealkb (ジュアルケービー juarukeebii) is a Japanese visual kei rock band made up of seven members, all of them comedians including London Boots Ichi-go Ni-go's Atsushi Tamura.

History
Their debut single Metronome hit number 1 on the indies Oricon chart and sold out the same day. The band's name is a Japanese anagram for "visual kei" (ビージュアルケー biijuarukee).

Dunch is also in the supergroup Karasu, that formed in 2009 with Tatsurou (Mucc), Hiroto (Alice Nine), Mizuki (Sadie) and Kenzo (Ayabie).

Discography
Singles
Metronome (05/31/2006)
Koi Kizu (恋傷) (10/25/2006)
Julia (11/29/2006)
Kuroi Sabaku (黒い砂漠) (04/11/2007) (Ending theme of Elite Yankee Saburo)
Chikai (誓い) (11/07/2007)
Fly (03/12/2008)
Hana (花) (06/11/2008)
Nageki no Endless (嘆きのエンドレス) (10/22/2008) (Opening theme of Ten no Haoh)
Will (08/05/2009)
Makemagic (01/20/2010) (Theme song for Yu-Gi-Oh! Movie: Super Fusion! Bonds that Transcend Time)
Super Special Summer (06/30/2010)
Shoushin Macchiato (傷心マキアート) (10/13/2010)
Reboot (11/02/2016)
R.P.S. (11/22/2017)

Albums
Roses (05/16/2007)
Noroshi (狼煙) (11/26/2008)
Invade (02/09/2011)
Against (09/14/2011)
V (10/10/2012)
Jealkb no Kore Kawanakute Inde Live ni Kite Kudasai (ジュアルケービーのコレ買わなくて いーんでライブに来てください) (06/25/2014)
Identity (07/19/2017)

TV appearances
Jealkb has appeared on Menguo Selection. The band also composed "Nageki no Endless", the opening theme for the anime series Legends of the Dark King.

References

External links
Official website

Japanese progressive rock groups
Japanese alternative rock groups
Visual kei musical groups